Thiotricha is a genus of moths in the family Gelechiidae, subfamily Thiotrichinae.

Species
Thiotricha acrantha Meyrick, 1908
Thiotricha acronipha Turner, 1919
Thiotricha acrophantis Meyrick, 1936
Thiotricha albicephalata Walia and Wadhawan, 2004
Thiotricha amphixysta Meyrick, 1929
Thiotricha anarpastis Meyrick, 1927
Thiotricha angelica Bradley, 1961 (Solomon Islands)
Thiotricha animosella (Walker, 1864)
Thiotricha anticentra Meyrick, 1904
Thiotricha argyrea Turner, 1919
Thiotricha arthrodes Meyrick, 1904
Thiotricha attenuata Omelko, 1993
Thiotricha atractodes Meyrick, 1922
Thiotricha aucupatrix Meyrick, 1929
Thiotricha balanopa Meyrick, 1918
Thiotricha bullata Meyrick, 1904
Thiotricha celata Omelko, 1993
Thiotricha centritis Meyrick, 1908
Thiotricha characias Meyrick, 1918
Thiotricha chinochrysa Diakonoff, 1954
Thiotricha chrysantha Meyrick, 1908
Thiotricha chrysopa Meyrick, 1904
Thiotricha cleodorella (Zeller, 1877)
Thiotricha clepsidoxa Meyrick, 1929
Thiotricha clidias Meyrick, 1908
Thiotricha clinopeda Meyrick, 1918
Thiotricha coleella (Constant, 1885)
Thiotricha complicata Meyrick, 1918
Thiotricha corylella Omelko, 1993
Thiotricha crypsichlora Meyrick, 1927
Thiotricha cuneiformis Meyrick, 1918
Thiotricha delacma Meyrick, 1923
Thiotricha dissobola Meyrick, 1935
Thiotricha embolarcha Meyrick, 1929
Thiotricha epiclista Meyrick, 1908
Thiotricha eremita Bradley, 1961 (Solomon Islands)
Thiotricha flagellatrix Meyrick, 1929
Thiotricha fridaella Legrand, 1958 (from Seychelles)
Thiotricha fusca Omelko, 1993
Thiotricha galactaea Meyrick, 1908
Thiotricha galenaea Meyrick, 1908
Thiotricha gemmulans Meyrick, 1931
Thiotricha glenias Meyrick, 1908
Thiotricha godmani (Walsingham, [1892])
Thiotricha grammitis Meyrick, 1908
Thiotricha hamulata Meyrick, 1921
Thiotricha hemiphaea Turner, 1919
Thiotricha hexanesa Meyrick, 1929
Thiotricha hoplomacha Meyrick, 1908
Thiotricha indistincta Omelko, 1993
Thiotricha janitrix Meyrick, 1912
Thiotricha laterestriata (Walsingham, 1897)
Thiotricha leucothona Meyrick, 1904
Thiotricha lindsayi Philpott, 1927
Thiotricha majorella (Rebel, 1910)
Thiotricha margarodes Meyrick, 1904
Thiotricha melanacma Bradley, 1961 (Solomon Islands)
Thiotricha microrrhoda Meyrick, 1935
Thiotricha nephelodesma Meyrick, 1926
Thiotricha nephodesma Meyrick, 1918
Thiotricha niphastis Meyrick, 1904
Thiotricha obliquata (Matsumura, 1931)
Thiotricha obvoluta Meyrick, 1918
Thiotricha oleariae Hudson, 1928
Thiotricha operaria Meyrick, 1918
Thiotricha orthiastis Meyrick, 1905
Thiotricha oxygramma Meyrick, 1918
Thiotricha oxyopis Meyrick, 1927
Thiotricha oxytheces Meyrick, 1904
Thiotricha pancratiastis Meyrick, 1921
Thiotricha panglycera Turner, 1919
Thiotricha paraconta Meyrick, 1904
Thiotricha parthenica Meyrick, 1904
Thiotricha polyaula Meyrick, 1918
Thiotricha pontifera Meyrick, 1932
Thiotricha prosoestea Turner, 1919
Thiotricha prunifolivora Ueda & Fujiwara, 2005
Thiotricha pteropis Meyrick, 1908
Thiotricha pyrphora Meyrick, 1918
Thiotricha rabida Meyrick, 1929
Thiotricha rhodomicta Meyrick, 1918
Thiotricha rhodopa Meyrick, 1908
Thiotricha saulotis Meyrick, 1906
Thiotricha scioplecta Meyrick, 1918
Thiotricha sciurella (Walsingham, 1897)
Thiotricha scotaea Meyrick, 1908
Thiotricha strophiacma Meyrick, 1927
Thiotricha subocellea (Stephens, 1834)
Thiotricha symphoracma Meyrick, 1927
Thiotricha synacma Meyrick, 1918
Thiotricha syncentritis Meyrick, 1935
Thiotricha synodonta Meyrick, 1936
Thiotricha tenuis (Walsingham, 1891) (The Gambia, Seychelles, South Africa)
Thiotricha termanthes Meyrick, 1929
Thiotricha tethela Bradley, 1961 (Solomon Islands)
Thiotricha tetraphala Meyrick, 1885
Thiotricha thorybodes Meyrick, 1885
Thiotricha trapezoidella (Caradja, 1920)
Thiotricha trichoma (Caradja, 1920)
Thiotricha tylephora (Meyrick, 1935)
Thiotricha wollastoni (Walsingham, 1894)
Thiotricha xanthaspis Meyrick, 1918
Thiotricha xanthodora Meyrick, 1923

References

 
Thiotrichinae
Taxa named by Edward Meyrick
Moth genera